Tom Spezialy is an American television producer, director and screen writer. In 2007, began serving as executive producer of Reaper.

Career
Spezialy began his career in 1989 writing for the CBS television series Doctor Doctor. He has also written and produced for Parker Lewis Can't Lose, Weird Science, The District, That Was Then, Jack & Jill, Ed, and Dead Like Me. He has directed a few numbers of television series such as Reaper and Honey, I Shrunk the Kids: The TV Show.

During the 2004–2005 television season, Spezialy became known as executive producer and writer for Desperate Housewives, one of the season's best received premieres. Following the criticized second season of the show, "creative differences" arose between Spezialy and the series creator, Marc Cherry, and in May 2006 Spezialy announced that he was leaving the crew of Desperate Housewives.

As of spring 2011, Spezialy created and served as an executive producer on the CBS comedy-drama television series CHAOS. More recently, he has a first look deal at Amazon Studios, joining the Sony's Spider-Man Universe series Silk.

References

External links
 

American television directors
American soap opera writers
American male television writers
Living people
Soap opera producers
American television producers
Year of birth missing (living people)
Place of birth missing (living people)
American male writers
American male screenwriters